Magda Umer (born Małgorzata Magda Umer, October 9, 1949) is a Polish singer and performer of sung poetry, journalist, author, film director, screenwriter, actress, and author of recitals.

Biography 
She was born to Edward Umer, the head of the Special Section of the Main Directorate of Information of the Polish Army and Stanisława Umer. Her father was Jewish, son of Otylia and Wincenty Umer, brother of Adam Humer. Both of Magda Umer's parents were atheists; she converted to Roman Catholicism as an adult. Her godmother was actress Kalina Jędrusik.

She graduated from Klement Gottwald High School in Warsaw (now the Stanisław Staszic High School). Later she studied at the Faculty of Polish Philology at Warsaw University. She made her debut in the late 1960s by singing in student cabarets.

Magda Umer has two sons, Mateusz and Franciszek.

Awards and honors 
She is a winner of the Opole Song Festival.

By order of the President of the Republic of 15 December 2000 "for outstanding contribution to the activities of the student movement, for achievements in social work" Umer was awarded the Knight's Cross of the Order of the Restoration of Poland.

Discography

Studio albums

Collaborative albums

Compilation albums

Video albums

References

External links

Official website
Discography on poezja-spiewana.pl

1949 births
Converts to Roman Catholicism from atheism or agnosticism
Living people
Musicians from Warsaw
Polish women singers
Polish people of Jewish descent
Polish Roman Catholics
University of Warsaw alumni